Kujawski (femine: Kujawska) may refer to:
 coming from Kuyavia (Kujawy), Poland

People 
 Kazimierz I Kujawski (c. 1211–1267), Polish prince
 Mariusz Kujawski (born 1986), Polish sprint canoer 
 Peter Kujawski, American film studio executive

Places 
 Aleksandrów Kujawski
 Brześć Kujawski
 Duchy of Brześć Kujawski
 Brześć Kujawski Voivodeship
 Peace of Brześć Kujawski
 Dąbrówka Kujawska
 Izbica Kujawska
 Kępa Kujawska
 Lubień Kujawski
 Piotrków Kujawski
 Solec Kujawski

See also 
 Podpiwek kujawski
 Kujawiak (disambiguation)